Vadim Denisovich Pronskiy (born 4 June 1998) is a Kazakh cyclist, who currently rides for UCI WorldTeam .

He joined the team permanently from the 2020 season onwards.

Major results

2015
 2nd Trofeo Dorigo Porte
 2nd Time trial, National Junior Road Championships
2016
 1st  Time trial, Asian Junior Road Championships
 National Junior Road Championships
1st  Road race
1st  Time trial
 1st Stage 2 Giro della Lunigiana
 1st  Mountains classification Giro di Basilicata
 4th Overall Tour du Pays de Vaud
 4th Overall Peace Race Juniors
2017
 1st  Young rider classification Giro della Valle d'Aosta
 2nd Overall Bałtyk–Karkonosze Tour
1st  Young rider classification
1st Stage 5
2018
 1st  Overall Giro della Valle d'Aosta
1st  Points classification
1st Stage 4
 6th Overall Tour Alsace
2019
 1st  Young rider classification CRO Race
 1st  Young rider classification Tour of Austria
2nd Overall Tour de Guadeloupe
1st  Young rider classification
 3rd Overall Tour de Langkawi
 7th Overall Tour de l'Ain
1st  Young rider classification
2021 
 3rd Overall Adriatica Ionica Race
1st  Young rider classification
2022
 3rd Overall Adriatica Ionica Race

Grand Tour general classification results timeline

References

External links

1998 births
Living people
Kazakhstani male cyclists
Sportspeople from Astana
Kazakhstani people of Russian descent
Olympic cyclists of Kazakhstan
Cyclists at the 2020 Summer Olympics
21st-century Kazakhstani people